Sazdice is a village and municipality in the Levice District in the Nitra Region of Slovakia.

History
In historical records the village was first mentioned in 1261.

Geography
The village lies at an altitude of 128 metres and covers an area of 18.236 km². It has a population of about 435 people.

Ethnicity
The village is approximately 63% Hungarian and 37% Slovak.

Facilities
The village has a public library, museum of village history, football pitch and voluntary firefighter organisation.

External links
http://www.statistics.sk/mosmis/eng/run.html

Villages and municipalities in Levice District